Gilbert McKenna (1800 – after 1877) was a political figure in Nova Scotia, Canada. He represented Shelburne County in the Nova Scotia House of Assembly from 1840 to 1843 and from 1847 to 1851.

He was born in Shelburne, Nova Scotia, the son of Duncan McKenna, a United Empire Loyalist originally from Scotland. McKenna was educated in Shelburne and Halifax. In 1846, he married Mary Stalker. McKenna was called to the province's Legislative Council in 1868.

References 
 The Canadian parliamentary companion for 1875, HJ Morgan

1800 births
Year of death missing
Nova Scotia pre-Confederation MLAs
Members of the Legislative Council of Nova Scotia